, real name , is a Japanese manga artist and the third president of animation production company Tatsunoko Pro.

History
Ippei Kuri was born Toyoharu Yoshida on January 1, 1940, in Kyoto. As a child, he read comics such as Superman that were discarded by American troops stationed in Japan during the Allied occupation following World War II. Kuri stated he wanted to make a manga like that when he grew up. This had an influence on his manga and anime character design style. He attended Kyoto Municipal Rakuyō High School (now Kyoto Municipal Rakuyō Technical High School), but left in 1958 before graduating in order to join his older brother Kenji in Tokyo to work as a manga artist.

He worked as an assistant for his older brother Tatsuo, who was already a successful illustrator and manga artist. In 1962, Kuri co-founded the animation production company Tatsunoko Productions with his brothers Kenji and Tatsuo. Since then, he has worked in many different roles, including as an animation producer, in planning and design, and as a director.

Kuri was appointed the managing director of Tatsunoko Pro subsidiary Anime Friend in 1977. In 1987, due to the retirement of his brother Kenji, Kuri became the president of Tatsunoko Pro. Anime Friend was dissolved in 1990. Tatsunoko Pro became a subsidiary of the major toy manufacturer Takara on July 1, 2005, and Kuri stepped down as president at that time. The Yoshida brothers' involvement in the company has since been very limited.

At the 10th Animation Kobe event in October 2005, Kuri was awarded the special award for lifetime contributions to anime as a general producer at Tatsunoko Pro. Kuri is currently a guest professor at the Kyoto University of Arts and Crafts.

Works
Listed in chronological order.

Manga
  with Minoru Kume (1960-1961)
  (1962-1964, Weekly Shōnen Sunday, Shueisha)
 Judo Boy (writer, 1961–1962, Shōnen Book, Shueisha)
  (1967-1968, Weekly Shonen Sunday, Shueisha)
 Judo Boy (writer, 1968–1969, Weekly Shōnen Sunday and Weekly Shōnen Jump, Shueisha)
 
 
 
 
 Messenger of Allah (Bōken-Ō, Akita Shoten)

Anime
 Space Ace (1965-1966, planning, script, executive producer, character designer, animation director)
 Speed Racer (1967-1968, executive producer)
 Judo Boy (1969, creator, series director, executive producer)
 The Adventures of Hutch the Honeybee (1970–71, executive producer, series director)
  (1971, series director, executive producer, animation director, key animator)
 Pinocchio: The Series (1972-1973, executive producer)
 Science Ninja Team Gatchaman (1972-1974, producer)
 Demetan Croaker, The Boy Frog (1973, producer)
 Casshan (1973-1974, producer)
 New Honeybee Hutch (1974, producer)
 Tekkaman: The Space Knight (1975, producer, executive producer)
 Time Bokan (1975-1976, planning, producer)
 Gowappa 5 Gōdam (1976, executive producer)
 Paul's Miraculous Adventure (1976-1977, producer)
 Temple the Balloonist (1977-1978, executive producer)
 Yatterman (1977-1979, planning, producer)
 Gatchaman II (1978-1979, producer, character designer)
 Gatchaman Fighter (1979-1980, planning, producer)
 Zenderman (1979-1980, planning, producer)
 Gordian Warrior (1979-1981, planning, character designer)
 Muteking, The Dashing Warrior (1980-1981, planning, producer, character designer)
 Rescueman (1980-1981, planning, producer)
 Dash Kappei (1981-1982, planning)
 Golden Warrior Gold Lightan (1981-1982, planning, character design)
 Yattodetaman (1981-1982, planning, producer)
 Gyakuten! Ippatsuman (1982-1983, planning, producer)
 Itadakiman (1983, planning, producer)
 Mirai Keisatsu Urashiman (1983, planning)
  (1985-1986, planning)
 Doteraman (1986-1987, development)
 Zillion (1987, producer)
 Oraa Guzura Dado (1987-1988, planning)
 The Adventures of Hutch the Honeybee (1989-1990, producer, character design)
 Legend of Heavenly Sphere Shurato (1989-1990, producer)
 Kyatto Ninden Teyandee (1990-1991, general production manager)
 Robin Hood (1990-1992, animation producer)
 Tekkaman Blade (1992-1993, producer)
 Casshan: Robot Hunter (1993, executive producer)
 Time Bokan: Royal Revival (1993-1994, planning, producer)
 The Story of Cinderella (1996, producer)
 Speed Racer X (1997, character development, art director, theme song lyrics, etc.)
 Yobarete Tobedete! Akubi-chan (2001-2002, planning, producer)

Books
  (November 2004, Kodansha)

References

External links
Ippei Kuri biography on Lambiek
 

1940 births
Anime directors
Japanese anime producers
Japanese animated film directors
Japanese animated film producers
Living people
Manga artists
People from Kyoto
Tatsunoko Production people